American rock band Marilyn Manson has released eleven studio albums, one live album, one compilation album, two extended plays, 33 singles, nine promotional singles, six video albums, and 44 music videos.

After forming in 1989 and signing a contract with Nothing Records and Interscope in 1993, the band released their first studio album, Portrait of an American Family (1994). Although initially not a commercial success, the album would eventually be certified gold by the RIAA for shipments in excess of 500,000 copies. Spurred by their version of the Eurythmics's "Sweet Dreams (Are Made of This)", the band's first EP, Smells Like Children (1995), became a commercial success, selling over a million copies in the US alone. In 1996, the band released their second studio album, Antichrist Superstar, which reached number three on the Billboard 200 and has sold over 1.9 million copies in the US. The album went on to sell over seven million copies worldwide, and was supported by the release of 1997's Remix & Repent EP. Their third studio album, Mechanical Animals (1998), was a commercial and critical success, reaching number one on the Billboard 200, as well topping the charts in as Australia and Canada. Mechanical Animals was later followed by their first live album, The Last Tour on Earth (1999), which included the promotional single "Astonishing Panorama of the Endtimes".

In 2000, the band released Holy Wood (In the Shadow of the Valley of Death), which also had massive worldwide success. Their fifth studio album, The Golden Age of Grotesque (2003), was a modest commercial success in their native US, debuting at number one with sales of 118,000 copies. As of November 2008, the album has sold 526,000 copies in the US. In contrast, the album was, by far, Manson's most successful internationally, peaking within the top five in most of the major European markets. Their sixth album, Eat Me, Drink Me, was released in 2007 and debuted at number eight on the Billboard 200. The High End of Low (2009), reached number four on both the US and Canadian album charts, but was their last album released by Interscope. After signing a deal with Cooking Vinyl, the band released Born Villain in 2012. Their ninth studio album, The Pale Emperor, was released on January 15, 2015, debuting at number eight in the US with their highest first-week sales since Eat Me, Drink Me in 2007. Heaven Upside Down was released on October 6, 2017. Their most recent album, We Are Chaos, was released on September 11, 2020.

Albums

Studio albums

Live albums

Compilation albums

Extended plays

Singles

Promotional singles

Other charted songs

Guest appearances

Videography

Video albums

Music videos

Other releases

Independent releases

Notes

References

Heavy metal group discographies
Discographies of American artists
Discography